Suhum Municipal District is one of the thirty-three districts in the Eastern Region, Ghana. Originally it was formerly part of the then-larger Suhum-Kraboa-Coaltar District in 1988, which was created from the former  Suhum-Kraboa-Coaltar District Council, until the southern part of the district was split off to create Ayensuano District on 28 June 2012; thus the remaining part has been renamed as Suhum Municipal District, which was also elevated into municipal district assembly status in that same year. The municipality is located in the southern part of Eastern Region and has Suhum as its capital town.

Sources

References

Districts of the Eastern Region (Ghana)